Cameron Desmond Archer (born 9 December 2001) is an English professional footballer who plays as a forward for Middlesbrough on loan from  club Aston Villa. Archer is a product of the Aston Villa Academy. He joined Aston Villa academy aged eight from local side Walsall and has progressed through all age groups to the first team, making his senior debut in August 2019. Internationally, Archer has represented England at both U20 and U21 levels.

Club career
Living nearby in Walsall, Archer started training with Aston Villa at the age of eight after a spell with Walsall, and progressed through their academy sides, regularly playing in higher year groups for his age. He broke into the U23 side at the age of 16 and has been a regular ever since.

Aston Villa
Archer came off the bench to make his senior debut for Villa at the age of 17 years 262 days in an EFL Cup tie against Crewe Alexandra on 27 August 2019. Villa were an invited side for 2019-20 EFL Trophy, fielding an under-21 side in the competition, Archer started in both of Villa's group matches against Salford City and Tranmere Rovers, scoring from 18 yards early in the game against Tranmere in a 2–1 defeat.

On 2 October 2020, Archer signed for Solihull Moors in the National League on loan until January 2021. He made his debut from the subs bench the following day, in a 2–1 away defeat to Woking. On 10 October 2020, Archer got his first two goals in senior league football in a 5–0 victory over King's Lynn Town. On 4 January 2021, the loan was extended until the end of the season with no option to recall.

On 24 August 2021, Archer scored a hat-trick, his first senior goals for the club, in his first senior start, a 6–0 victory against Barrow in the second round of the EFL Cup. On 22 September, Archer scored against Chelsea in the third round of the EFL Cup in a 1–1 draw that Chelsea won on penalties 4–3. Three days later, Archer made his Premier League debut, coming on as an 86th-minute substitute in a 1–0 victory over Manchester United at Old Trafford.

On 24 January 2022, Archer joined Preston North End on loan until the end of the season. Two days later, on 26 January, Archer scored on his debut in the Championship, a 2–0 away victory at West Bromwich Albion.

In the build-up to the 2022–23 season, there was much debate about Archer's future, with a number of Championship teams linked with loan moves for the player. On 1 August 2022, Aston Villa manager Steven Gerrard announced that after impressing on a pre-season tour of Australia, Archer would remain with the club and be a part of the Premier League squad. On 5 August, Archer signed a new 5-year contract with The Villans. 

Having found first-team opportunities to be limited, Archer joined Championship club Middlesbrough on loan until the end of the season on 6 January 2023. Archer made his Middlesbrough debut the following day, as a substitute in a 5–1 FA Cup defeat to Premier League Brighton & Hove Albion.

International career 
Born in England, Archer is eligible to represent the England national football team, as well as Jamaica, through his mother. On 11 November 2021, Archer made his debut for England under-20s, in a 2–0 defeat to Portugal.

On 25 May 2022, Archer received his first call up to the England U21 squad ahead of the final round of 2023 UEFA European Under-21 Championship qualification matches. He made his debut as a 68th-minute substitute during a 2–1 victory away to Czech Republic on 3 June 2022. On 7 June 2022, Archer scored his first goal for the England U21s in a 3–0 2023 UEFA European Under-21 Championship qualification win against Albania.

Personal life
Archer is the younger brother of Jordan McFarlane-Archer, a professional footballer currently signed for Southport. Archer is known as 'Cam' and attended Christ Church CE Primary and Walsall Academy secondary school.

Honours
Individual
EFL Trophy Player of the Round (Round 1): 2021–22
EFL Trophy Top Goalscorer: 2021–22

Career statistics

References

2001 births
Living people
English footballers
England youth international footballers
English sportspeople of Jamaican descent
Association football forwards
Black British sportsmen
Aston Villa F.C. players
Solihull Moors F.C. players
Preston North End F.C. players
Middlesbrough F.C. players
National League (English football) players
Premier League players
English Football League players
England under-21 international footballers